The 2009 Mobil 1 12 Hours of Sebring was the 57th running of the 12 Hours of Sebring and the opening round of the 2009 American Le Mans Series season. It took place at the Sebring International Raceway, Florida on March 21, 2009. Three new cars made their debut at Sebring: Audi's diesel R15 TDI, Acura's first LMP1 entry the ARX-02a, and the return of the BMW M3 to the GT2 category. It was also the last time GT1 category raced at the event.

Tom Kristensen, Allan McNish, and Rinaldo Capello won, Audi's ninth Sebring victory in eleven attempts, and set several event records in the process. Peugeot fell 22 seconds short of the winning Audi. While Acura's LMP1s failed to survive for twelve hours, their lone LMP2 entry was the sole finisher in the category and earned Fernández Racing their first ALMS victory. The GT1 category was fought amongst only the two Corvette Racing cars, while GT2's battle of manufacturers was won by Ferrari and the Risi Competizione team.

Entry
For the start of the American Le Mans Series season, 28 cars were officially entered, with the bulk of the entries in LMP1 and GT2.  The 2008 race winners, Penske Racing Porsche, did not return to defend their title. Four manufacturers were represented in LMP1, including a duo of R15 TDIs, Audi's latest diesel prototype, being entered by Joest Racing. Peugeot returned once more with their 908 HDi FAP, entering two cars compared to last year's single Sebring entry. Acura made their LMP1 debut with the new ARX-02a being run by de Ferran Motorsport and Highcroft Racing, while the remaining two entries were Lola-AERs entered by Intersport Racing and Autocon Motorsports. LMP2 consisted of two teams entering three cars, with Fernández Racing once again running an Acura and Dyson Racing partnering with Mazda for two Lola coupés.

GT1 was once again left to just Corvette Racing with two cars, while GT2 dominated the entry list with 15 cars. Porsche was represented by two cars each from Flying Lizard Motorsports and VICI Racing, as well as a single entry for Farnbacher-Loles Racing. Ferrari once again aligned with Risi Competizione for two cars, while the Italian-Argentinian Advanced Engineering PeCom team also represents the brand. BMW made their return to the series with two M3 E92s for Rahal Letterman Racing. The rest of the GT2 field was made of a mix of teams and automotive brands, including LG Motorsport's Chevrolet Corvette, PTG's Panoz, Primetime's Dodge Viper, Robertson's Ford GT, and Drayson's Aston Martin.

Report

Qualifying
Held on Thursday, March 19, two 15-minute qualifying sessions were held to determine the starting grid. The two GT categories qualified in the first session, led by the two GT1 Corvettes. Only setting a few laps, the #4 Corvette of Oliver Gavin out qualified his teammate, Jan Magnussen. In GT2 Porsche locked in the first two spots on the grid, led by Dirk Werner of Farnbacher-Loles. Advanced Engineering PeCom led Ferrari with a third place spot, while Robertson Racing's Ford GT earned fifth. BMW's debut was hampered by mechanical problems for the #92 car, while the #90 of Bill Auberlen qualified seventh.

In the LMP qualifying session, Acura was able to upset both Audi and Peugeot by earning pole position in their LMP1 debut. De Ferran Motorsports' driver Scott Dixon outpaced Tom Kristensen's Audi by less than a tenth of a second, while Christian Klien led Peugeot to third. Acura earned a second pole position in the session as Fernández Racing led the LMP2 category, nearly two seconds ahead of the fastest Dyson Lola-Mazda.

After qualifying the VICI team, who had one qualifier, withdrew from the event. This decreased the starting grid to 26 cars.

Qualifying result
Pole position winners in each class are marked in bold.

Race
The field crossed the starting line to begin the 12 Hours of Sebring at 10:30 am EST. Although the de Ferran Acura led from pole position, the lead of the race was quickly taken by Audi before the first turn, followed by Peugeot. The #08 Peugeot started at the tail of the field due to power steering problems forcing it to begin from pit lane. One of the two Rahal Letterman BMW's also suffered problems on the grid and had to be taken to the garage, finally starting the race nearly an hour late. An early on track incident was a collision between the #40 Robertson Ford and the #45 Flying Lizard Porsche, with the Porsche requiring extensive repairs.

During pit stops in the first few hours of the race, Audi changed their Michelin tires at every opportunity while Peugeot opted to change tires at every other pit stop. This allowed Peugeot to take the lead. The Highcroft Acura suffered a spin in the hands of David Brabham, forcing the Robertson Ford to evade the Acura and hit the wall outside Sunset Bend, bringing out the first full-course caution. A second caution was required an hour later to retrieve the Intersport Lola-AER after its engine failed while on the circuit.

While Sébastien Bourdais led the race in Peugeot #08, he suffered a spin on Sunset Bend while diminished his lead by 20 seconds, but he was able to continue. The #07 Peugeot however came to the pits for a lengthy stop to repair an air conditioning fan in the cockpit, dropping it from contention. Meanwhile, the Dyson Racing Team retired their two cars from the event, as did the remaining Rahal Letterman BMW, all due to engine failures.

A third caution period came out when David Brabham once again spun his Highcroft Acura, this time making light contact with a wall. While Peugeot still led in the eighth hour of the race, Audi began to double stint their tires for the first time when Lucas Luhr brought the third place Audi in for a scheduled stop but did not change tires. This aided Audi in retaking the lead from Peugeot during the race's ninth hour. Peugeot #08 then suffered a small leak in a rear tire, requiring the team to make an unscheduled pit stop to replace it. The two LMP1 Acuras meanwhile suffered mechanical problems, eventually leading to the retirement of both de Ferran and Highcroft.

In the closing hours, the #45 Porsche, having rebounded from its incident early in the race, was attempting to pass the PTG Panoz for third place in GT2 when the two came into contact at the exit of Sunset Bend. The Porsche, driven by Marc Lieb, was spun into the concrete wall and required extensive repairs while the Panoz continued on. In the closing hours, Peugeot and Audi traded the lead as each team made their respective pit stops. Peugeot #08 led as it came to the pits for its final stop, but Audi needed only a short refuel on their final stop several laps later. This allowed Audi driver Allan McNish to exit the pits after his final stop ahead of Peugeot with only fifteen minutes remaining. By the race finish the margin of victory between the #2 Audi and #08 Peugeot was 22 seconds.

Tom Kristensen earned his record fifth overall win. The Lowe's Fernández Racing Acura was the sole survivor in LMP2, finishing in fourth overall, while Corvette Racing #3 outperformed its teammate in GT1. The GT2 class was won by the Ferrari of Risi Competizione, while the European Advanced Engineering PeCom Ferrari was second. Panoz completed the GT2 class podium. In the Michelin Green X Challenge, the race winning #2 Audi was the most efficient LMP, while the #3 Corvette lead GTs.

Race result
Class winners in bold. Cars failing to complete 70% of winner's distance marked as Not Classified (NC).

References

External links
 American Le Mans Series
 Sebring International Raceway

Sebring
12 Hours of Sebring
12 Hours Of Sebring
12 Hours Of Sebring